Battery B, 1st Rhode Island Light Artillery Regiment was an artillery battery that served in the Union Army during the American Civil War.

Service
Battery B, 1st Rhode Island Light Artillery Regiment was organized in Providence, Rhode Island and mustered in for a three-year enlistment on August 18, 1861 under the command of Captain Thomas F. Vaughan.

The battery was attached to Stone's Brigade, Division of the Potomac, to October 1861. Artillery, Stone's (Sedgwick's) Division, Army of the Potomac, to March 1862. Artillery, 2nd Division, II Corps, Army of the Potomac, to June 1863. Artillery Brigade, II Corps, to June 1865. It mustered out of service on June 13, 1865.

Detailed service

Left Rhode Island for Washington, D.C., August 23. Duty at Camp Stone and along Upper Potomac until February, 1862. Operations on the Potomac October 21–24, 1861. Battle of Ball's Bluff October 21. March to Harpers Ferry, W. Va., February 25–26, 1862, and duty there until March 7. Moved to Charlestown, thence to Berryville March 7–10. Advance toward Winchester March 13–14. Return to Harpers Ferry, then moved to Washington. D.C., and Hampton, Va., March 22-April 1. Siege of Yorktown April 5-May 4. Battle of Fair Oaks (Seven Pines) May 31-June 1. Seven days before Richmond June 25-July 1. Peach Orchard and Savage Station June 29. Charles City Cross Roads and Glendale June 30. Malvern Hill July 1. At Harrison's Landing until August 16. Movement to Fortress Monroe, then to Alexandria and Fairfax Court House August 16–31. Cover retreat of Pope's Army from Bull Run to Washington August 31-September 2. Maryland Campaign September. Battles of South Mountain September 14, and Antietam September 16–17. Moved to Harpers Ferry September 22, and duty there until October 30. Reconnaissance to Charlestown October 16–17. Advance up Loudoun Valley and movement to Falmouth, Va., October 30-November 17. Battle of Fredericksburg December 11–15. Duty at Falmouth until April 27, 1863. Chancellorsville Campaign April 27-May 6. Maryes Heights, Fredericksburg, May 3. Salem Heights May 3–4. Banks' Ford May 4. Gettysburg Campaign June 11-July 24. Battle of Gettysburg July 1–4. Advance from the Rappahannock to the Rapidan September 13–17. Bristoe Campaign October 9–22. Auburn and Bristoe October 14. Advance to line of the Rappahannock November 7–8. Mine Run Campaign November 26-December 2. At Stevensburg, Va., until May 1864. Demonstration on the Rapidan February 6–7. Campaign from the Rapidan to the James May–June. Battles of the Wilderness May 5–7; Spotsylvania May 8–12; Spotsylvania Court House May 12–21. Assault on the Salient May 12. North Anna River May 23–26. Line of the Pamunkey May 26–28. Totopotomoy May 28–31. Cold Harbor June 1–12. Before Petersburg June 16–18. Siege of Petersburg June 16, 1864 to April 2, 1865. Jerusalem Plank Road June 22–23, 1864. Deep Bottom July 27–28. Strawberry Plains, Deep Bottom, August 14–18. Ream's Station August 25. Hatcher's Run October 27–28. Dabney's Mills February 5–7, 1865. Appomattox Campaign March 28-April 9. Fall of Petersburg April 2. Sayler's Creek April 6. High Bridge and Farmville April 7. Appomattox Court House April 9. Surrender of Lee and his army. Moved to Washington, D.C., May 2–15. Grand Review of the Armies May 23.

Casualties
The battery lost a total of [STILL RESEARCHING] men during service; 1 officer and 13 enlisted men killed or mortally wounded, 15 enlisted men died of disease.

Commanders
 Captain Thomas F. Vaughan
 Captain John G. Hazard - commanded at the battles of Antietam and Fredericksburg
 Captain Thomas Frederick Brown - wounded in action at Gettysburg, July 2, 1863
 Lieutenant William S. Perrin - commanded at Gettysburg after Cpt Brown's was wounded

Legacy
Battery B, 1st Battalion, 103rd Field Artillery Regiment, Rhode Island National Guard traces is origins to this battery.  This, however, is a false lineage as Battery B, 1st Rhode Island Light Artillery ended its existence in 1865 and Battery B was not established until 1917.

See also

 List of Rhode Island Civil War units
 Rhode Island in the American Civil War

Notes

References
 Dyer, Frederick H.  A Compendium of the War of the Rebellion (Des Moines, IA:  Dyer Pub. Co.), 1908.
 
 Rhodes, John H. The History of Battery B, First Regiment Rhode Island Light Artillery, in the War to Preserve the Union, 1861-1865 (Providence, RI:  Snow & Farmham, Printers), 1894.  [reprinted in 1997]
 Straight, Charles Tillinghast.  Battery B, First R.I. Light Artillery, August 13, 1861-June 12, 1865 (Central Falls, RI:  E. L. Freeman Co.), 1907.
Attribution

External links
 Battery B, 1st Rhode Island Light Artillery monument at Gettysburg
 Battery B, 1st Rhode Island Light Artillery living history organization
 Story of the "Gettysburg Gun"
 Full text of the "Gettysburg Gun" by John H. Rhodes
 Text and video of artillery positions at Gettysburg, including Battery B, 1st Rhode Island Light Artillery; includes excellent modern images of the "Gettysburg Gun"
 Restored Bible of Alfred E. Gardiner of Battery B (includes personal inscriptions)
 Battery B frock coat belonging to Capt. James E. Chace
 Restoration of T. Fred Brown’S Battery B 1st Rhode Island Light Artillery Cap

Military units and formations established in 1861
Military units and formations disestablished in 1865
1st Rhode Island Light Artillery, Battery B
1861 establishments in Rhode Island
Artillery units and formations of the American Civil War